Frankford Township is a township in Sussex County, in the U.S. state of New Jersey. As of the 2020 United States census, the township's population was 5,302, a decrease of 263 (−4.7%) from the 2010 census count of 5,565, which in turn reflected an increase of 145 (+2.7%) from the 5,420 counted in the 2000 census.

Frankford Township was formed on April 10, 1797, from portions of Newton Township, and was incorporated on February 21, 1798, as one of New Jersey's initial 104 townships by an act of the New Jersey Legislature. Portions of the township were taken to form Lafayette Township and Sparta Township (both established on April 14, 1845), along with Branchville (March 9, 1898), which is completely surrounded by the township. The township was said to have been named after Frankford, a neighborhood of Philadelphia, after a visitor who hailed from that area came to help out at the rural school in the township.

Since 1976, the township has been the home of the Farm and Horse Show, which expanded after it was relocated from Branchville. The New Jersey State Fair / Sussex County Farm & Horse Show has evolved as the site of numerous activities and events throughout the year. The township's Skylands Park, a 4,300-seat baseball park, was home to the New Jersey Cardinals of the New York–Penn League from 1993 to 2005, and the Sussex Skyhawks of the Can-Am League from 2006 to 2010. Since 2005, the stadium is the home of the Sussex County Miners, which plays as part of the Frontier League.

Geography
According to the United States Census Bureau, the township had a total area of 35.30 square miles (91.42 km2), including 33.88 square miles (87.74 km2) of land and 1.42 square miles (3.68 km2) of water (4.02%). Culver's Lake and Lake Owassa, two natural lakes nestled below the Kittatinny Mountain, form the northern border.

The borough of Branchville is completely surrounded by Frankford Township, making it part of 21 pairs of "doughnut towns" in the state, where one municipality entirely surrounds another. The township borders the Sussex County municipalities of Hampton Township, Lafayette Township, Sandyston Township and Wantage Township.

Ross Corner (with a 2010 Census population of 13) is an unincorporated community and census-designated place (CDP) located within Frankford Township. Augusta is another unincorporated community located within the township. Other unincorporated communities, localities and place names located partially or completely within the township include Armstrong, Culvers Gap, Culvers Inlet, Culvers Lake, Lake Owassa, Mount Pisgah, Northrup, Pallettown, Pellettown, Plains and Wykertown.

History

Geology
Most of Frankford Township is on the Ordovician Martinsburg Formation. This is a shale, slate, and limestone formation created 450 million years ago when a chain of volcanic islands collided with proto North America. This is a dark, almost black, shale.  However the Jacksonburg formation rides over the Martinsburg shale in most areas. This shale is silver in color in the inside of the shale.

The islands went over the North American plate, creating the Highlands of Sussex County.  The Kittatinny Valley was uplifted.  The sediment at the bottom of seas was uplifted and formed shale.  Millions of years of erosion occurred and there was a second event.  About 400 million years ago small continent that was long and thin, collided with proto North America creating folding and faulting. The Silurian Shawnangunk conglomerate that was under a shallow sea, lifted due to pressure.  The pressure created heat which melted the silica, bonded the quartz and conglomerate together, creating Kittatinny Mountain.

The Wisconsin Glacier covered all of the township from 21,000 BCE to 13,000 BCE. The glacier covered the top of Kittatinny Mountain.  End moraines exist in Stokes State Forest as well as just off County Route 565 north of the Skylands Park. Also about a mile south of Ross's Corner is an end moraine. An esker was created when the glacier retreated due to climate warming. Many ponds and lakes created.  Culver Lake was created at this time, as the drainage became blocked. The township is drained by two river systems.  The Paulinskill and the Wallkill. The Paulinskill travels in a northwesterly direction throughout the township before turning southwest.  Papakatkin Creek starts east of Branchville Reservoir and drains into the Wallkill River north of the town of Sussex.  Another creek starts near the base of Sunrise Mountain and empties into the Papakatkin Creek near Pellettown. Dry Creek starts at the Branchville Reservoir, travels south and enters into Culver's Creek in Branchville; eventually empties into the Paulinskill. There is a chain of  hills between Dry Creek and Papakatin Creek.  These hills are what separate the two river drainage systems. The drainage divide is just north of Route 206 and the goes northwest toward Branchville Reservoir.  Water near Route 206 or south of Route 206 drains into the Paulinskill. Water north of Route 206 drains into the Wallkill River.

Culvers Gap was made by an ancient stream that was later diverted.

Paleo Indians
After the glacier melted, the area was cold and wet. The area was a Tundra Biome which grasses grew slowly. This is when Paleo Indians came into the area around 11,000 BCE. After several thousand years, the area became warmer. As the climate warmed, vegetation patterns changed. With change in plant life,  herbivore megafauna slowly died out.  Or were concentrated in certain areas which allowed for over hunting by Paleo-Indians. Coniferous forests of spruce and pine began to grow. The area then became a Taiga Biome. Paleo Indians carried spears with fluted points made of black chert or jasper.  They used Culver's Gap to travel from the Flatbrook Valley to the Kittatinny Valley. This route was later used by Native Americans. Paleo Indians made temporary camps and traveled often as they were hunter gatherers.  It is difficult to locate their camps as they are located many feet below the present ground surface of today. One would have to search the Pleistocene gravels.

Mastodons, Musk Ox and Caribou roamed the area. The bones of Mastodons were found in Highland Lakes, Swartswood Lake, Great Meadows, and in Orange County, New York. As climate warmed, megafauna either traveled north, were over hunted, or became extinct due to lack of food.

Climate warmed between 8000 BCE to 6000 BCE.  At this time more deciduous trees such as oak, maple, birch,  and willows began to grow.  Other big game then slowly inhabited the area, such as deer, elk, bear, and moose.

By 3000 BCE other deciduous trees grew such as hickory, cherry, walnut, beech, butternut, chestnut, ash and elm. Hunter gatherers populations slowly grew as now there was more food in the forests. The Paulinskill River is shallow which allowed for easy fishing. The valley has small hills which allowed for easy travel and setting up camps. Due to the diversity of the deciduous trees and plants growing in the grasslands, game was everywhere. Gathering became more intensive.

Around 1000 BCE, clay pottery was invented which allowed the storage of seeds, nuts and other food. The bow and arrow was also invented around  this time. Hunter gatherer populations began to rise more due to the ability to store nuts in pottery and procure game through the bow and arrow.  However camps were still temporary and traveling was still done often in search of game and plants. As populations grew, camps became more seasonal. These camps were along rivers.  It was at this time that the Lenape Native Americans entered the area from the west.

Lenape Native Americans
The Lenape settled this area around 1000 BCE or slightly later.  They settled their seasonal extended family camps along the river valleys as food and water was abundant there.  They had a trade route that went through the township.  The path started at Minisink Island on the Delaware and went to Raritan Bay. The path went from Minisink Island to Culver's Gap, and continued through Frankford Twp. where it crossed the Paulinskill River and went south, east of Newton.
Around the year 800 CE to 1000 CE, triangular projectile points were developed.  This was the beginning of the bow and arrow in North America.  It was also at this time around the year 1000 CE that agriculture began to be developed along with clay pottery.  With potter, the bow and arrow, along with agriculture; Native American populations grew even more. The Lenape were still hunter gatherers and supplemented their procuring of wild game with corn, beans and squash. They had gardens that were round or oval in fertile river valleys. 
The Paulinskill River and the surrounding valley offered excellent area for family camps of Native Americans. The Paulinskill River is shallow and narrow which allowed for easy fishing, bathing, and gathering of plants. Game also is attracted to the river valley such as deer, bear, waterfowl and other small game. Since the land is flat, this allowed for easy traveling, hunting and food gathering such as various nuts. 
Culvers Lake was the site of Native American villages and Papakating Creek was used as a campsite.
Many trees were huge, which allowed for large nut crops each autumn. The Native American populations continued to grow even though they were living in a late Stone Age culture. Populations expanded until the Little Ice Age and European arrival.

The Little Ice Age and European contact
The Little Ice Age began in the early 17th century and ended in the mid 19th century. In the late 17th century is when Europeans came into contact with the Lenape Native Americans in this area. The Little Ice Age had to have a drastic effect on Native American populations in this area. The area had late frosts in June and early frosts in August. This would have had not only an effect on corn crops, but on hunting game as well for the Native Americans. Corn took longer to grow than the corn farmers grow today. Trees bearing nuts such as Oak, Hickory, Beech, Walnut, Butternut, and Chestnut would have reduced nut crops by cold weather. Game animals tend to go into a semi hibernation during cold spells which would make game more difficult to find.  Extreme cold weather and deep snow also made finding game difficult. Shallow rivers such as the Paulinskill and Wallkill froze quickly, thus reducing the ability to fish. Due to these factors many Native Americans starved in this area.

Native Americans had no immunity to European diseases because of separation from Europe and Asia for thousands of years made them vulnerable to European diseases.  Because Native Americans traveled and traded with each other, getting smallpox was not that difficult. Population of Native Americans perished because of this also.  The Native populations decreased during the late 17th century and early 18th century in Frankford Township and the rest of New Jersey due to disease.

By 1750 nearly all the Native Americans were gone from this area.  This was due to land patents, disease from Europeans, and starvation from several hundred years of the Little Ice Age.

Early European settlement
The first permanent settlement of European settlers in the township probably happened around 1699. At that time, this area was part of Burlington County. In 1713 this area was part of Hunterdon County, as Hunterdon separated from Burlington.  Later the area was included in Morris County when it separated from Hunterdon County.
 
The land was flat with fresh water from the Paulinskill, Dry Creek or Papakatkin Creek. A Quaker meeting house was established in 1700 near Papakating Creek near Plains Road.  Settlers may have been here as early as 1699.  Soil was fertile for farming.  Huge trees in virgin forests were everywhere. Game, fish and waterfowl were abundant.  The land was cleared for farming.  The forests were slowly cut down with axes. Fire was used to clear land.  The area was still cold due to the Little Ice Age so farming progressed slowly. Colonists raised pigs, chickens, sheep, and cattle brought from Europe. Apples trees were also planted. The area was controlled by England and part of Morris County at this time.

Settlers came from New York State by way of the Wallkill River drainage or by route through Culver's Gap. The Highlands to the east were difficult to cross.

French and Indian War
George Washington started the French and Indian war at the battle of Jumonville Glen on May 28, 1754 in southwestern Pennsylvania by killing French soldiers and a French diplomate Joseph Coulon de Villiers de Jumonville. At that time, Frankford Township was near the edge of the frontier and settlers just west of the township were being attacked by Native Americans.  Farms and houses were burned; settlers killed.  Many colonists moved east to be safe. Eight fortified houses were built from Phillipsburg, New Jersey to Port Jervis, New York along the Delaware River.  Native Americans sided with the French due to being treated unfairly by the English, such as the Walking Purchase of 1737 and land patents.  The Native Americans did not understand how the English viewed land possession.

Demographics

2010 census

The Census Bureau's 2006–2010 American Community Survey showed that (in 2010 inflation-adjusted dollars) median household income was $96,518 (with a margin of error of +/− $9,850) and the median family income was $102,986 (+/− $10,972). Males had a median income of $69,861 (+/− $5,596) versus $53,269 (+/− $13,178) for females. The per capita income for the borough was $38,276 (+/− $2,921). About 2.9% of families and 3.1% of the population were below the poverty line, including 2.5% of those under age 18 and 1.9% of those age 65 or over.

2000 census
As of the 2000 United States census there were 5,420 people, 1,839 households, and 1,473 families residing in the township. The population density was 158.9 people per square mile (61.4/km2). There were 2,295 housing units at an average density of 67.3 per square mile (26.0/km2). The racial makeup of the township was 98.15% White, 0.39% African American, 0.06% Native American, 0.39% Asian, 0.50% from other races, and 0.52% from two or more races. Hispanic or Latino of any race were 1.77% of the population.

There were 1,839 households, out of which 37.4% had children under the age of 18 living with them, 70.4% were married couples living together, 6.7% had a female householder with no husband present, and 19.9% were non-families. 16.5% of all households were made up of individuals, and 6.1% had someone living alone who was 65 years of age or older. The average household size was 2.81 and the average family size was 3.17.

In the township the age distribution of the population shows 25.0% under the age of 18, 6.6% from 18 to 24, 26.4% from 25 to 44, 29.0% from 45 to 64, and 13.0% who were 65 years of age or older. The median age was 41 years. For every 100 females, there were 96.7 males. For every 100 females age 18 and over, there were 92.9 males.

The median income for a household in the township was $64,444, and the median income for a family was $69,449. Males had a median income of $49,781 versus $31,383 for females. The per capita income for the township was $25,051. About 3.5% of families and 5.1% of the population were below the poverty line, including 5.3% of those under age 18 and 6.0% of those age 65 or over.

Government

Local government
Frankford Township is governed under the Township form of New Jersey municipal government, one of 141 municipalities (of the 564) statewide that use this form, the second-most commonly used form of government in the state. The governing body is comprised of a three-member Township Committee, whose members are elected directly by the voters at-large in partisan elections to serve three-year terms of office on a staggered basis, with one seat coming up for election each year as part of the November general election in a three-year cycle. At an annual reorganization meeting held in the first week of January, the committee selects one of its members to serve as mayor and another as deputy mayor.

, members of the Frankford Township Committee are Mayor Emery "Sam" Castimore Jr. (R, term on township committee and as mayor ends on December 31, 2022), Deputy Mayor David Silverthorne (R, elected to a term on committee ending 2023; term as deputy mayor ends 2022), James P. Ayers (R, 2023), Nicholas Civitan (R, 2022) and Edwin F. Risdon Jr. (R, 2024).

In February 2021, David Silverthorne was appointed to fill the vacant seat expiring in December 2023 that had been held by Chris Carney until he stepped down from office at the start of the year to take office on the Sussex County Board of County Commissioners. Silverthorne served on an interim basis until the November 2021 general election, when he was elected to serve the balance of the term of office.
Constitutional officers are: administrator / acting clerk, Lori Nienstedt; chief financial officer, Sharon Yarosz; tax collector, Stephen Lance; and tax assessor, Jason Laiker.

Federal, state and county representation
Frankford Township is located in the 5th Congressional District and is part of New Jersey's 24th state legislative district.

 

Sussex County is governed by a Board of County Commissioners whose five members are elected at-large in partisan elections on a staggered basis, with either one or two seats coming up for election each year. At an annual reorganization meeting held in the beginning of January, the board selects a commissioner director and deputy director from among its members, with day-to-day supervision of the operation of the county delegated to a County Administrator. , Sussex County's Commissioners are 
Commissioner Director Anthony Fasano (R, Hopatcong, term as commissioner and as commissioner director ends December 31, 2022), 
Deputy Director Chris Carney (R, Frankford Township, term as commissioner ends 2024; term as deputy director ends 2022), 
Dawn Fantasia (R, Franklin, 2024), 
Jill Space (R, Wantage Township, 2022; appointed to serve an unexpired term) and 
Herbert Yardley (R, Stillwater Township, 2023). In May 2022, Jill Space was appointed to fill the seat expiring in December 2022 that had been held by Sylvia Petillo until she resigned from office.

Constitutional officers elected on a countywide basis are 
County Clerk Jeffrey M. Parrott (R, Wantage Township, 2026),
Sheriff Michael F. Strada (R, Hampton Township, 2022) and 
Surrogate Gary R. Chiusano (R, Frankford Township, 2023). The County Administrator is Gregory V. Poff II, whose appointment expires in 2025.

Politics
As of March 2011, there were a total of 4,054 registered voters in Franford Township, of which 510 (12.6% vs. 16.5% countywide) were registered as Democrats, 2,349 (57.9% vs. 39.3%) were registered as Republicans and 1,192 (29.4% vs. 44.1%) were registered as Unaffiliated. There were 3 voters registered as Libertarians or Greens. Among the township's 2010 Census population, 72.8% (vs. 65.8% in Sussex County) were registered to vote, including 92.2% of those ages 18 and over (vs. 86.5% countywide).

In the 2012 presidential election, Republican Mitt Romney received 1,901 votes (64.9% vs. 59.4% countywide), ahead of Democrat Barack Obama with 953 votes (32.6% vs. 38.2%) and other candidates with 61 votes (2.1% vs. 2.1%), among the 2,927 ballots cast by the township's 4,074 registered voters, for a turnout of 71.8% (vs. 68.3% in Sussex County). In the 2008 presidential election, Republican John McCain received 2,101 votes (65.5% vs. 59.2% countywide), ahead of Democrat Barack Obama with 1,027 votes (32.0% vs. 38.7%) and other candidates with 64 votes (2.0% vs. 1.5%), among the 3,208 ballots cast by the township's 4,119 registered voters, for a turnout of 77.9% (vs. 76.9% in Sussex County). In the 2004 presidential election, Republican George W. Bush received 2,092 votes (70.0% vs. 63.9% countywide), ahead of Democrat John Kerry with 846 votes (28.3% vs. 34.4%) and other candidates with 36 votes (1.2% vs. 1.3%), among the 2,989 ballots cast by the township's 3,678 registered voters, for a turnout of 81.3% (vs. 77.7% in the whole county).

In the 2013 gubernatorial election, Republican Chris Christie received 71.7% of the vote (1,325 cast), ahead of Democrat Barbara Buono with 25.0% (462 votes), and other candidates with 3.4% (62 votes), among the 1,869 ballots cast by the township's 4,095 registered voters (20 ballots were spoiled), for a turnout of 45.6%. In the 2009 gubernatorial election, Republican Chris Christie received 1,602 votes (67.4% vs. 63.3% countywide), ahead of Democrat Jon Corzine with 533 votes (22.4% vs. 25.7%), Independent Chris Daggett with 190 votes (8.0% vs. 9.1%) and other candidates with 39 votes (1.6% vs. 1.3%), among the 2,377 ballots cast by the township's 4,033 registered voters, yielding a 58.9% turnout (vs. 52.3% in the county).

Education
Students in public school for pre-kindergarten through eighth grade attend the Frankford Township School District, at Frankford School, located in Branchville. Students from Branchville attend the district's school as part of a sending/receiving relationship. As of the 2021–22 school year, the district, comprised of one school, had an enrollment of 505 students and 54.5 classroom teachers (on an FTE basis), for a student–teacher ratio of 9.3:1.

For ninth through twelfth grades, public school students attend High Point Regional High School. Attending the school are students from Branchville, Frankford Township, Lafayette Township, Montague Township, Sussex Borough and from Wantage Township. As of the 2021–22 school year, the high school had an enrollment of 812 students and 72.8 classroom teachers (on an FTE basis), for a student–teacher ratio of 11.2:1. The district is governed by a nine-member board of education; seats on the board are allocated based on the population of the constituent municipalities, with two seats assigned to Frankford Township.

Transportation

U.S. Route 206 is the main highway serving Frankford Township. Route 15, County Route 519, County Route 521 and County Route 565 also pass through the township.

Notable people

People who were born in, residents of, or otherwise closely associated with Frankford Township include:

 Gary R. Chiusano (born 1951), member of the New Jersey General Assembly and former mayor
 Russ Van Atta (1906–1986), MLB pitcher who played with the New York Yankees and St. Louis Browns and was later elected as Sheriff of Sussex County

References

External links

 Frankford Township website
 Sussex County webpage for Frankford Township
 Frankford Township School District
 
 School Data for the Frankford Township School District, National Center for Education Statistics
 High Point Regional High School
 New Jersey Horse Enthusiast Web
 NO Mall movement in Frankford

 
1797 establishments in New Jersey
Papakating Creek watershed
Populated places established in 1797
Township form of New Jersey government
Townships in Sussex County, New Jersey